Porte des Lilas may refer to:

 Porte des Lilas, a city gate of Paris and the surrounding area
 Porte des Lilas (Paris Métro), the Paris Métro station that services the Porte des Lilas area
 Porte des Lilas (film), a 1957 French-Italian dramatic film directed by René Clair